Squibs is a 1935 British  musical romantic comedy film directed by Henry Edwards and starring Betty Balfour, Gordon Harker and Stanley Holloway.

It was produced by Twickenham Film Studios with sets designed by James A. Carter. It was a remake of the 1921 film Squibs which also starred Balfour.

Synopsis
In this musical comedy, a Cockney flower girl is in love with a policeman whom she wants to marry. Her father opposes the union because he is involved in a little crooked investing. The young woman wins a lottery and is able to find wealth and marital bliss.

Cast
 Betty Balfour as Amelia "Squibs" Hopkins  
 Gordon Harker as Sam Hopkins  
 Stanley Holloway as Constable Charley Lee  
 Margaret Yarde as Mrs. Lee  
 Morris Harvey as Inspector Lee  
 Michael Shepley as Colin Barratt  
 Drusilla Wills as Mrs. Parker  
 O. B. Clarence as Sir John Barratt  
 Ronald Shiner as Bill  
 Thomas Weguelin as Alf  
 Vivienne Chatterton 
 William Daunt
 Aubrey Fitzgerald 
 Henryetta Edwards as Susan 
 Olive Sloane as Barmaid

References

Bibliography
 Low, Rachael. Filmmaking in 1930s Britain. George Allen & Unwin, 1985.
 Wood, Linda. British Films, 1927-1939. British Film Institute, 1986.

External links
 
 
 

1935 films
1935 romantic comedy films
British black-and-white films
British musical comedy films
British romantic comedy films
Films directed by Henry Edwards
Films shot at Twickenham Film Studios
1935 musical comedy films
Films set in London
British romantic musical films
Remakes of British films
Sound film remakes of silent films
1930s romantic musical films
Films about lotteries
1930s English-language films
1930s British films